Joren van Pottelberghe (born 5 June 1997) is a Swiss professional ice hockey goaltender for EHC Biel of the National League (NL). He previously played for HC Davos.

Playing career
van Pottelberghe was drafted 110th overall by the Detroit Red Wings in the 2015 NHL Entry Draft. He became the first Swiss player ever drafted by the Red Wings. He made his professional debut for HC Davos during the 2016–17 season where he posted a 2.62 goals against average (GAA) and .906 save percentage in 17 games.

On 8 January 2020, he signed a two-year contract with EHC Biel of the NL. On 30 August 2021, he signed a two-year contract extension with EHC Biel.

International play
van Pottelberghe represented Switzerland at the 2015 IIHF World U18 Championships. He represented Switzerland at the 2016 World Junior Ice Hockey Championships where he posted a 2–3 record, with a 3.15 GAA and .887 save percentage in six games. He again represented Switzerland at the 2017 World Junior Ice Hockey Championships where he posted a 1–3 record, with a 3.16 GAA and .909 save percentage in five games.

On 18 January 2022, he was named to Team Switzerland men's national ice hockey team's roster for the 2022 Winter Olympics. He is the youngest player on the roster for Switzerland. However, after being diagnosed with COVID-19, he was excluded from the national team along with Sven Senteler.

Career statistics

Regular season and playoffs

International

References

External links
 

1997 births
Living people
EHC Biel players
EHC Kloten players
HC Davos players
Detroit Red Wings draft picks
Swiss ice hockey goaltenders
People from Zug
Sportspeople from the canton of Zug
Swiss people of Belgian descent